A by-election was held for the New South Wales Legislative Assembly seat of Dulwich Hill on 20 June 1953 because of the resignation of George Weir to accept an appointment as a judge of the New South Wales Industrial Commission.

Candidates
 Cliff Mallam ran a ferry service on Port Hacking.
 William Ness was an estate agent and the son of former member John Ness.
 John Sheehan was a grocer from Punchbowl. Antony Green lists him as an independent, however The Sydney Morning Herald listed him as a communist.

Result

George Weir resigned to accept an appointment as a judge of the New South Wales Industrial Commission.

See also
Electoral results for the district of Dulwich Hill
List of New South Wales state by-elections

References

New South Wales state by-elections
1953 elections in Australia
1950s in New South Wales